is a train station in Yoshino, Yoshino District, Nara Prefecture, Japan.

Lines 
 Kintetsu Railway
 Yoshino Line

Platforms and tracks

Connections
 Yoshino Town Community Bus (Smile Bus)
 for Yoshino Hospital, Mount Yoshino

Surrounding
 Yoshino Shrine

External links

References

Railway stations in Japan opened in 1928
Railway stations in Nara Prefecture